Thomaz Costa, stage name of Thomaz Roberto Costa Santos (born June 14, 2000), is a Brazilian actor.

Biography and career 
Thomaz was born in São Paulo, the son of Luciana Santos and Roberto, and the older brother of Lívia Helena. He has been studying theater since he was 3 years old. Thomaz's first job was Claro's commercial called Claro Conselhos. This advertisement was recorded in Montevideo, Uruguay. He was the winner of the "Cena em Ação" contest of the Hebe program at SBT, Thomaz won a role in the novel "Vende-se um Véu de Noiva". The following year he appeared in the Brazilian production of the musical show "O Rei e Eu", a sophisticated production that obtained excellent reviews and nominations, which premiered on February 27, 2010 in São Paulo, at Teatro Alfa. In 2012, he participated in the Brazilian remake of the novel Carrossel, where he interpreted the scholar Daniel Zapata, both reprinting in the series Patrulha Salvadora of 2014 and in the cinemas in Carrossel: The Film of 2015 and in the continuation Carrossel 2: O Sumiço de Maria Joaquina de 2016. In 2018, he became an evangelical Christian and was baptized in the waters. In 2022, joined the sexy rehearsal platform OnlyFans. Months later, he announced that he would stop publishing his intimate content, as his new decision is to build a family.

Filmography

Television

Film

Stage

References

External links 

 

2000 births
Living people
Male actors from São Paulo
Brazilian male television actors
Brazilian male film actors
Brazilian male child actors
Brazilian male stage actors
Brazilian evangelicals
Converts to evangelical Christianity